Sentinel Peak (also known as Sentinel Mountain) is a mountain in Kananaskis, Alberta, Canada. It is located in the Livingstone Range, east of Sentinel Pass. The headwaters of the Pekisko Creek originate on the slopes of the mountain.

The mountain was named in 1884 by George M. Dawson although he referred to it as Sentinel Mountain on his 1886 map.

References

Two-thousanders of Alberta
Canadian Rockies